Botswana Communication Regulatory Authority (BOCRA) is a government agency founded under the Communications Regulatory Authority Act, 2012 (CRA Act) on the 1st of April 2013. BOCRA is responsible for regulating all matters related to telecommunications (wire, cellular, satellite and cable), postal services of Botswana.

History 
BOCRA was established in 2013 to replace Botswana Telecommunications Authority by the Government of Botswana Parliament when the Telecommunications Act of 1996 was amended and revised to create the Communications Regulatory Authority.

Country code top level domain 
During the formation of BOCRA, it was given to administer and manage the .bw country TLD.

See also 
 List of telecommunications regulatory bodies
 List of Operators in Botswana
 Commonwealth Telecommunications Organisation

References

External links 

 

Government agencies of Botswana
Communications authorities
Telecommunications regulatory authorities